Aslı Duman (born ) is a  Turkish female water polo player, playing at the point position. She is part of the Turkey women's national water polo team. She competed at the 2016 Women's European Water Polo Championship.

She is a member of Ege Water Sports and Tennis Club.

References

1992 births
Living people
Turkish female water polo players
Place of birth missing (living people)